Tinissa eumetrota is a moth of the family Tineidae. It was described by Edward Meyrick in 1926. It is found in New Ireland.

References

Moths described in 1926
Scardiinae